The Philippine half-centavo coin (½¢), a denomination of Philippine currency, was issued when the Philippines was under US administration. It bears the names of both countries: Filipinas (the Spanish name of the Philippines) and the United States of America.

Filipino sculptor Melecio Figueroa was hired to design the coin. It features a man with a hammer and anvil, seating in front of Mayon Volcano.

In 1903 and 1904, the US mint at Philadelphia struck bronze-minted half-centavo coins for circulation. Eventually, the coin was withdrawn from circulation because it was rejected by Filipinos for its low value. After 1908, all remaining half centavos were melted.

References

Philippines currency history
Half-base-unit coins
Obsolete denominations of the Philippine peso